Brazill is a surname. Notable people with the surname include:

Ashleigh Brazill (born 1989), Australian netball player
Frank Brazill (1899–1976), American baseball player
LaVon Brazill (born 1989), American football player
Mark Brazill (born 1962), American television producer
Nathaniel Brazill (born 1986), American murderer
Sister Philippa Brazill (1896–1988), Australian nurse

See also
Brazil (surname)